Thyrocopa abusa is a moth of the family Xyloryctidae. It was first described by Edward Meyrick in 1915. It is endemic to the Hawaiian island of Kauai.

The length of the forewings is about 10 mm. The forewing ground color is mottled light whitish brown and brown. The discal area is clouded with poorly defined blackish spots. The spots on the distal half of the costa and along the termen at the vein endings are not visible. The hindwings are very light brown. The fringe is light whitish brown.

External links

Thyrocopa
Endemic moths of Hawaii
Moths described in 1915